Wauconda Community Unit School District 118 is an Illinois school district serving the Lake County communities of Wauconda, Island Lake, Lakemoor, Volo, Port Barrington, and Lake Barrington. The district governs three elementary schools (Cotton Creek School, Robert Crown School, and Wauconda Grade School), two middle schools (Matthews Middle School and Wauconda Middle School), and one high school (Wauconda High School).

References

External links
https://www.d118.org/

School districts in Lake County, Illinois